Endimione is the Italian spelling of Endymion. It may refer to:

 Endimione, a 1706 serenata set by Giovanni Bononcini
 Endimione, a 1721 serenata set by Antonio Maria Bononcini
 Endimione (de), a 1721 musical serenata by Pietro Metastasio
 Endimione, a 1743 setting of Metastasio's libretto by Johann Adolph Hasse
 Endimione, a 1776 setting of Metastasio's libretto by Michael Haydn
 Endimione, a character in Cavalli's 1651 libretto La Calisto